Arisha Razi Khan (Urdu: عریشہ رضی) is a Pakistani actress and television host in the Urdu television industry. She started her career with acting some branded commercials ads; she did her first commercial at the age of three and a half years. She opened her own karachi based clothing brand itsforu with her elder sister Sara Razi Khan. She became a popular child artist acting in the comedy show Hum Sab Umeed Sai Hain. She is best known for her performance in several commercially successful television series, including Omer Dadi Aur Gharwale, Mastana Mahi, Kitni Girhain Baaki Hain, Aastana, Sannata, Na Kaho Tum Mere Nahi, Tanhai, Malika-e-Aliya, Abro, Sadqay Tumhare, Baba Jani

Career
She started to work in the dramas Mastana Mahi, Na Kaho Tum Mere Nahi, Omar Dadi aur Gharwalay, She hosted a segment in the popular comedy show Hum Sub Umeed Sai Hain. Later she also co-hosted Wah Wah SubhanAllah, a na`at competition for children. She appeared in Tanhai along with Goher Mumtaz, Ayesha Omar, Azfar Rehman and Saba Hameed. Tanhai was aired on Hum TV.

Television

Films

References

External links 
 

 
 
 https://itsforucloset.com/Personal website

Living people
Actresses from Karachi
Pakistani child actresses
2000 births